The 1937 Montana State Bobcats football team was an American football team that represented Montana State College (later renamed Montana State University) in the Rocky Mountain Conference (RMC) during the 1937 college football season In its second season under head coach Jack Croft, the team compiled a 3–4–1 record (0–3–1 against RMC opponents), yet outscored opponents by a total of 171 to 105. Clifford Norris was the team captain.

Schedule

References

Montana State
Montana State Bobcats football seasons
Montana State Bobcats football